Leon Raszeja (1901–1939) was a Polish activist.

1901 births
1939 deaths
People from Chełmno
Polish activists
Polish military personnel killed in World War II
Member of the Tomasz Zan Society